Çaraq (also, Çarah and Karakh) is a village and municipality in the Davachi Rayon of Azerbaijan.  It has a population of 219.  The municipality consists of the villages of Çarah, Kyünçal, Təkyə, Hacıisgəndərli, Güləh, and Uqah.

References 

Populated places in Shabran District